Uniküla is a village in Kastre Parish, Tartu County in eastern Estonia.

Until 2017 the village was in Haaslava Parish.

References

 

Villages in Tartu County
Kastre Parish